These are lists of exoplanets.  Most of these were discovered by the Kepler space telescope. There are an additional 2,053 potential exoplanets from Kepler's first mission yet to be confirmed, as well as 978 from its "Second Light" mission and 4,053 from the Transiting Exoplanet Survey Satellite (TESS) mission.

For yearly lists on physical, orbital and other properties, as well as on discovery circumstances and other aspects, see .

Nomenclature

Methods of detection

Specific exoplanet lists

Lists of exoplanets
List of directly imaged exoplanets
List of exoplanets discovered before 2000
List of exoplanets discovered between 2000–2009
List of exoplanets discovered in 2010
List of exoplanets discovered in 2011
List of exoplanets discovered in 2012
List of exoplanets discovered in 2013
List of exoplanets discovered in 2014
List of exoplanets discovered in 2015
List of exoplanets discovered in 2016
List of exoplanets discovered in 2017
List of exoplanets discovered in 2018
List of exoplanets discovered in 2019
List of exoplanets discovered in 2020
List of exoplanets discovered in 2021
List of exoplanets discovered in 2022
List of exoplanets discovered in 2023
List of exoplanet extremes
List of exoplanet firsts
List of exoplanets discovered by the Kepler space telescope
List of exoplanets observed during Kepler's K2 mission
List of extrasolar candidates for liquid water
List of multiplanetary systems
List of nearest exoplanets
List of nearest terrestrial exoplanet candidates
List of Neptunian exoplanets
List of potentially habitable exoplanets
List of proper names of exoplanets
List of transiting exoplanets

See also
 Lists of astronomical objects

References

External links
 The NASA Exoplanet Archive
 The Extrasolar Planet Encyclopaedia — Catalog Listing accessed in 2015-09-28
 Exoplanet Data Explorer accessed in 2015-09-28
 
 

 

Search for extraterrestrial intelligence
Lists of planets